The Philadelphia Phillies are a Major League Baseball (MLB) team based in Philadelphia, Pennsylvania. The Phillies compete in MLB as a member club of the National League (NL) East division. In the franchise's history, the owners and ownership syndicates of the team have employed 11 general managers (GMs) and appointed 15 team presidents. The GM controls player transactions, hiring and firing of the coaching staff, and negotiates with players and agents regarding contracts. The team president is the representative for the owner or the ownership group within the front office and is responsible for overseeing the team's staff, minor league farm system, and scouting.

The longest-tenured general manager is Paul Owens, with 11 years of service to the team in that role, from 1972 to 1983. Owens also served as the team manager in 1972, and from 1983 to 1984. After this time, he served as a team executive until 2003, and was inducted into the Philadelphia Baseball Wall of Fame in recognition of his services. The longest-tenured owner is Bob Carpenter, Jr., who was the team's primary shareholder from 1943 to 1972. He appointed the team's first general manager, Herb Pennock, during his tenure. In combination with his son, Ruly, the Carpenter family owned the Phillies for nearly 50 years (until 1981) until it was sold to Bill Giles, son of former league president Warren Giles. The Phillies are currently overseen by team president, Andy MacPhail.

Presidents and owners
The Phillies have employed 15 team presidents since their founding in 1883, beginning with sporting goods salesman Al Reach. The longest-tenured president is Bob Carpenter, Jr., who oversaw the club for 30 years. Currently, the office of team president is held by Andy MacPhail, who assumed the mantle in 2016. Ownership groups have often included the team president, but at other times, such as the tenure of Charles Phelps Taft, others were appointed to fill the president's role.

General managers

The Phillies' first GM was Herb Pennock, selected by owner Bob Carpenter, Jr. to oversee the team when he went into the army; before this time, GM duties were handled primarily by the team owner, and this would continue after Pennock's tenure when a GM was not present. On September 10, 2015, the Phillies announced they would not extend GM Rubén Amaro, Jr.'s contract. Amaro had led the team since 2008.

Footnotes
 Carpenter, as the owner, assumed GM duties after Pennock's death in 1948.
 Giles, as team president, assumed GM duties after Owens' resignation in 1983.

See also
Other executives
Jim Baumer (director of scouting)
Howie Bedell (director of farm system)
Dallas Green (director of scouting; special assistant to the GM)
Jay Hankins (director of scouting)
Chuck LaMar (assistant GM)
Gene Martin (director of farm system)
Sean Walker (Chief Technology Officer)

Related lists
List of Philadelphia Phillies managers

References
General

Inline citations

External links
Baseball America: Executive Database

 
 
Philadelphia
Owners